Helsinki City Museum is a museum in Helsinki that documents and displays the history of Helsinki, the capital of Finland. Its mission is to record and uphold Helsinki's spiritual, material and architectural heritage. The museum features personal memories and everyday life of the city's residents. It also acts as the regional museum for central Uusimaa with a mission to promote and steer museum activities in the region.

Helsinki City Museum is located next to the Senate Square in the oldest blocks of the city. It also operates four other museums around Helsinki: Villa Hakasalmi, Burgher's House, Worker Housing Museum and Tram Museum. Entrance to all museums is free of charge.

The museum's collections contain about one million photos, for instance popular photos of early 20th century Helsinki by Signe Brander, and 450,000 items.

References

External links
 
 Helsinki City Museum

Museums in Helsinki
Museums established in 1911
City museums
1911 establishments in Finland